Ill Al Skratch (also known as Brooklyn/Uptown Connection) is a hip hop duo consisting of two rappers, Big Ill from Brooklyn and Al Skratch from Harlem (Uptown). They are best known for their 1994 single, "I'll Take Her".

Biography
The duo's first appearance on record was their 1994 single named "Where My Homiez? (Come Around My Way)." This song failed to reach the Billboard Hot 100, but charted on Hot R&B/Hip-Hop Singles & Tracks. Ill Al Skratch soon released a follow-up single named "I'll Take Her." This song featured R&B musician Brian McKnight and reached #62 on the Billboard Hot 100. Soon after releasing their first two singles, they released Creep Wit' Me to minor critical acclaim. It also managed to reach the Billboard 200 and spawned a third single, "Chill With That."

Ill Al Skratch collaborated with various artists including Michael Jackson, Gina Thompson and Shaquille O'Neal from 1995 to 1996. Their works also appeared on the soundtracks of movies including New Jersey Drive and Panther. In 1997, they released Keep It Movin''', an album that received little commercial success and critical attention. They have not recorded any music since their 1997 album, but their songs have appeared on compilations including 1998's Hip Hop with R&B Flava''.

In 2012, Ill Al Skratch began releasing new music as B.U.C. (Brooklyn/Uptown Connection).

Discography

Albums

Singles

References

External links
Ill Al Skratch's Discography
Ill Al Skratch 2007 Interview with AllHipHop.com

African-American musical groups
American musical duos
Hip hop duos
Hip hop groups from New York City